George Leland Bach, also known as Lee Bach (1915-1994) was an American economist. He was the Frank E. Buck Professor of Economics and Piblic Policy at Stanford University.

Works
 Federal Reserve policy-making; a study in Government economic policy formation, 1950
 Economics; an introduction to analysis and policy, 1954
 (with Keith G Lumsden and Richard Attiyeh) Microeconomics; a programmed book, 1966
 Making monetary and fiscal policy, 1971
 The new inflation: causes, effects, cures, 1972

References

1915 births
1994 deaths
American economists
Stanford University Graduate School of Business faculty